Sri Krishna Leela may refer to:

 Shri Krishna Leela, 1971 Hindi film
 Sri Krishna Leela, 1977 Tamil film
 Sri Krishna Leela Tarangini, Sanskrit opera